Anders Nelsson is an actor and musician who emerged in the 1960s Hong Kong music scene. He was a member of the popular Hong Kong group The Kontinentals as well as the front man for Anders Nelson & The Inspiration. In later years he became an actor and in an early role he played a thug in the movie Way of the Dragon that starred Bruce Lee.

Early life
Nelsson was born in California, USA, to Swedish missionaries.  His family moved to Hong Kong in 1950 when he was 4 years old. He studied at King George V School between 1958 and 1965. Older kids in KGV allowed him to play in their bands in school hall. They played on Friday afternoons

Music career

1950s and 1960s

In the late 1950s, Nelsson was in a band called The Cagey 5 which was a twist around of the name of their school King George V. In a few years the band had become The Kontinentals.
In 1963 Nelsson's school band The Kontinentals, signed their first recording contract and shortly afterwards released I Think Of Her and I Still Love You, released on the Orbit Records label. Both were chart-topping hits in Hong Kong.  He was entertainment editor for sensationalist newspaper The Star in 1968.

1970 to 1976

In the 1970s, Nelson was the front man in a successful band called Ming

which was signed to EMI records. It was formed in 1973 and lasted until 1976. Most of the recordings the band made were composed by Nelsson. Some of the band's releases that did very well in the 1970s included "Never Coming Home" and "Reasons Why". Due to a few things he'd seen with other bands that included drinking backstage and taking drugs, also not wanting to sing past 30, he decided on a change of direction and as a result, he broke up Ming.

1976 onwards
In 1976 he switched to composing and producing and has written many jingles and film soundtracks, including the main theme for the award-winning Cantonese movie Mr. Vampire.

From 1976 to 1979 he worked for EMI (HK) Ltd as Artist & Repertoire Manager and in 1979 started his own group of Companies, The Melody Bank which became a successful production and publishing house, and The Entertainment Company, which managed several successful Hong Kong artists, including Rowena Cortes and Louie Castro.

10 years later he sold The Melody Bank to BMG Pacific Limited and joined this newly emerging 'major' in the music industry as Managing Director.

In this role he set up BMG's music publishing operations in the Asian Region as well as running the record company in Hong Kong.

After completing his three-year contract Nelsson was headhunted by the well-known Hong Kong Swaine family (patriarch of this family, Sir John Swaine QC was at the time chairman of both the Royal HK Jockey Club and the Legislative Council.) A new company called The Media Bank was set up under the Chairmanship of elder son John Swaine Junior, with Nelsson as MD. Through Nelsson's music industry contacts the company acquired representation of several indie labels and publishing catalogues.
Nelsson left the company shortly after the Handover of Hong Kong to China in 1997 to pursue China-related opportunities as a consultant.

Over the decades Nelsson has also presented concerts by and booked major international artists such as Kenny G, 

Elton John, Bob Dylan, INXS, Bananarama and Michael Bolton. He still books artists for corporate events and charity events.

He still enjoys singing and in mid-2005 started a new concept band…..the concept being that it can range in size from just Nelsson and a pianist up to as many musicians as a client can afford or accommodate on a stage! In view of this flexibility, he named the band INFINITY and the group has performed at many high-profile events including the 2005 Macau Grand Prix, the final New Year's Eve party at the legendary, now-closed, Hyatt Regency Hotel, the Canadian Community Ball (2004, 2005, 2006), the Jailhouse Rock party at the historical Victoria Prison to raise funds for the Community Chest and many private parties and events.

In September 2006 a Guangzhou, China-based record company released an album of Chinese favorites sung in English by Nelsson.

He is also recording a CD of some of his favorite songs for release in 2010 which will be the 60th anniversary of Nelsson's arrival in Hong Kong as a child in 1950 with his parents.

Producer
The artists that Nelsson has produced include Gracie Rivera, Mona Richardson, Carole and Perry Martin.

Acting
His acting career started with a small role in Bruce Lee's Way of The Dragon

in 1972. He got the part as a result of knowing Lee via his brother Robert Lee who was a fellow musician. He has appeared in countless Hong Kong-made TV dramas since then, for all the Hong Kong channels, CTV, RTHK, HK-TVB and RTV/ATV.

Among his roles have been Divine Retribution (ATV), Wiselee (TVB) and feature film Journey To The West with Nicholas Tse, released in late 2005. During late 2005 and early 2006 he taped several drama serials for HK-TVB including Stanley Story, which went on air on May 15, 2006 and Land of Wealth, which was screened in October 2006. He has also appeared as a guest in Jade Solid Gold and is currently seen as an expert promoting HK-TVB's HD-TV channels. He finds that having his face appear on TV on a regular basis opens many doors, especially in China, and keeps this aspect of his career as a business tool as well as hobby.

Other business interests
He is currently a well-respected entertainment industry and PR consultant doing work for prestigious Asian companies, including some of the major record companies, Hong Kong's popular restaurant and bar district Knutsford Terrace, and his native country of Sweden, through his group of companies, which include a music production company, a music publishing company and a PR company.

Nelsson is considered somewhat of an expert in music-related copyright matters and in a more serious side to his career has been engaged by the Hong Kong government as an expert witness from time to time. 
He has in the past served several terms as a director on the boards of both the Music Publishers Association (M.P.A.) and The Composers and Authors Society of Hong Kong (C.A.S.H.)

Honors and awards

 Order of the Knights of Rizal - (October 25, 2019).

Discography
 2011    Hong Kong Muzikland of the 60/70s 101
 2006    Spirit of Respect
 1986    Rock Remix (LP, Mixed
 1978    The Tattoo Connection OST

Filmography

Film
 2017 Chasing the Dragon
 2010 Bruce Lee, My Brother
 2016 iGirl mung ching yan
 1999 Century Hero
 1992 Once Upon A Time A Hero in China
 1990 Perfect Girls
 1989 Mr. Canton and Lady Rose
 1988 The Story of Hay Bo
 1988 Gong zi duo qing/The Greatest Lover 
 1986 Goodbye My Hero/Goodbye My Love
 1986 Lucky Stars Go Places
 1986 The Seventh Curse
 1983 All the Wrong Spies 
 1976 Bruce Lee: The Man,The Myth
 1972 The Way of The Dragon

Composer
 He's a Legend; He's a Hero (1976)
 The Tattoo Connection (1978)
 Marianna (1982)
 My Darling, My Goddess (1982)
 To Hell with the Devil (1982)
 Heroes Three (1983)
 Somewhere My Love (1984)
 Mr. Vampire (1985)
 Twinkle, Twinkle, Lucky Stars (1985)
 My Name Ain't Suzie (1985)
 Rocky’s Love Affairs (1985)
 Those Merry Souls (1985)
 The Millionaires Express (1986)
 Mr. Vampire II (1986)
 The First Vampire in China (1986)
 Love Me Vampire (1986)
 Return of the Demon (1987)
 Mr. Vampire Part 3 (1987)
 The Haunted Cop Shop (1987)
 The Seductress (1987)
 Scared Stiff (1987)
 Goodbye Darling (1987)
 Seven Years Itch (1987)
 My Cousin The Ghost (1987)
 Chaos by Design (1988)
 Miss Magic (1988)
 Who is The Craftiest (1988)
 What a Small World (1989)
 Burning Sensation (1989)
 Vampire vs Vampire (1989)
 Vampire Buster (1989)
 Mr. Vampire 1992 (1992)

Television
 Goodbye Victoria Peak  (1981)
 Goodbye Victoria Peak II (1981)
 Soldier of Fortun/Heung Sing Long Ji (1982)
 The Final Verdict II (1983)
 Young Dowager (1983)
 Legend of Ms. Choi Kam Fa (1988)
 Bandits from Hong Kong (1988)
 Sai gei chi chin/Divine Retribution (2000)
 Virtues of Harmony  (2002)
 Trimming Success  (2006)
 The Drive of Life / The Legendary Era  (2007)
 Ghetto Justice II   (2012)
 Silver Spoon, Sterling Shackles(2012)
 Highs and Lows  (2012)
 Smooth Talker  (2015)
 Blue Veins  (2016)
 Phoenix Rising  (2017)
 Daddy Cool (2018)
 OMG, Your Honour (2018)

References 

 https://web.archive.org/web/20110930094420/http://www.cash.org.hk/en/content/web.do?id=808080802d2b51c5012d79508722002f
 http://60spunk.m78.com/andersnelsson.html
 http://www.esf.edu.hk/wp-content/uploads/2014/05/AlumNews_May14.pdf

Websites
 https://www.facebook.com/andersnelsson
 

1946 births
Living people
American people of Swedish descent
Musicians from Berkeley, California
American emigrants to Hong Kong
Hong Kong people of Swedish descent
Hong Kong people of American descent
Hong Kong male television actors
Male actors from Berkeley, California
Hong Kong male film actors
20th-century Hong Kong male actors
20th-century American male actors
21st-century American male actors
21st-century Hong Kong male actors
20th-century American singers
Singer-songwriters from California